Marco Arrigoni (born 29 October 1988) is an Italian footballer who plays for Sanmarinese club S.S. Folgore Falciano Calcio.

Biography
Arrigoni was a youth product of A.C. Cesena. Arrigoni was loaned to Poggibonsi at the start of 2007–08 Serie C1. In January 2008 Arrigoni returned to Cesena. He was released on 1 July 2008. He spent a year in 2008–09 Serie D before returned to professional football. Since 2009 he was a player in Lega Pro Seconda Divisione – Italian fourth division.

References

External links
 Football.it Profile 
 

Italian footballers
A.C. Cesena players
U.S. Poggibonsi players
A.C. Bellaria Igea Marina players
Valenzana Mado players
Association football defenders
1988 births
Living people